James Slipper (born 6 June 1989) is an Australian rugby union player who plays at prop. Slipper formerly captained the Queensland Reds, now playing for ACT Brumbies. Slipper made his debut during the 2010 Super 14 season. In June 2010 Slipper came on as a substitute in Australia's victory over England, earning his first international cap.

Early life
Slipper was born and raised on the Gold Coast, Queensland. He first played junior rugby for the Bond Pirates in the local Gold Coast competition, before dedicating his weekends to playing for The Southport School (TSS) in the prestigious GPS schools competition. He would take part in a golden generation for TSS which included back-to-back GPS premierships in 2006 and 2007 while also being chosen to represent the Australian Schoolboys team three times in international fixtures. Following graduation, he signed a contract with the Queensland Reds.

Career

2010 season

In February 2010, Slipper made his Super Rugby debut against the New South Wales Waratahs at Suncorp Stadium in Brisbane.

Slipper was named in the squad for the Australia A national rugby union team's two matches against England in June 2010.

On 12 June 2010, Slipper made his debut for the Australia national rugby union team against England at Perth.  He is the 843rd player in history to represent Australia.  He quickly became a regular for the national team, playing in all six of Australia's matches in the 2010 Tri Nations Series. Slipper featured in 13 of the Wallabies 14 Tests during 2010.

2011 season

Slipper was chosen in Australia's 30-man squad for the 2011 Rugby World Cup.  He played in all of Australia's games during the tournament.

2015 season
On 16 January 2015, Slipper was appointed the new captain of the Queensland Reds, replacing James Horwill, who would be leaving the Reds at the end of the Super Rugby season to join English Premiership side Harlequin F.C.

On 5 September 2015, he captained the Wallabies to a 47–10 victory over the United States at Soldier Field in Chicago, as part of their preparations for the 2015 Rugby World Cup.

2018 season
In 2018, Slipper received a two-month ban after testing positive for cocaine.

2019 season

In 2019, the ACT Super Rugby team, the Brumbies, added James Slipper to their team. He was a very positive addition to a successful season, with the Brumbies finishing on the top of the Australian conference. Slipper was said to add wisdom and depth to the team.

2020 season

Slipper won his 100th cap for the Wallabies in a 24–22 victory over the All Blacks at Suncorp Stadium in Brisbane.

References

External links
 It's Rugby stats
 Queensland Reds profile
 Scrum profile
 Reds Player Profile
 Wallabies Player Profile

1989 births
Australian rugby union players
Australian rugby union captains
Australia international rugby union players
Queensland Reds players
Rugby union props
Sportspeople from the Gold Coast, Queensland
Living people
People educated at the Southport School
Doping cases in rugby union
Queensland Country (NRC team) players
ACT Brumbies players
Rugby union players from Queensland